is a Japanese professional baseball pitcher. He was born on April 16, 1988. He is currently playing for the Chiba Lotte Marines of the NPB.

On October 10, 2018, he was selected to be part of the Japan national baseball team at the 2018 MLB Japan All-Star Series, but on November 1, 2018, he canceled his participation. On February 27, 2019, he was selected for Japan national baseball team at the 2019 exhibition games against Mexico.

References

1988 births
Living people
Baseball people from Kagawa Prefecture
Chiba Lotte Marines players
Japanese baseball players
Nippon Professional Baseball pitchers
Japanese baseball coaches
Nippon Professional Baseball coaches